Tujan is a village in the former municipality of Dajt in Tirana County, Albania. At the 2015 local government reform it became part of the municipality Tirana.

History 
The Tujan Castle was built by the Illyrians since the Iron age but it fell into ruins before being rebuilt by the Byzantines in the 4th and 6th centuries.

References

Populated places in Tirana
Villages in Tirana County